The 1928 National Derby took place during August with the final being held at Harold's Cross Stadium in Dublin on 18 August 1928. It was the inaugural edition of the event. The race at this stage was considered unofficial because it had not been ratified by the Irish Coursing Club.

The winner was Tipperary Hills, owned and trained by Billy Quinn.

Final result 
At Harolds Cross, 18 August (over 525 yards):

Semi finals

1 length calculated at 0.08 sec

See also
 1928 UK & Ireland Greyhound Racing Year

References

Greyhound Derby
Irish Greyhound Derby